Mehrajuddin Wadoo (born 12 February 1984) is an Indian professional manager and former footballer. He is the current head coach of I-League club Mohammedan. During his playing days, Wadoo played for clubs such as Mohun Bagan, East Bengal, Salgaocar, Pune City, Chennaiyin, and Mumbai City. He also represented the India national team from 2005 to 2011.

Club career

Early career
He did his early schooling at Muyeen Public School, Sarai Balla, Iqra Masjid up to class X and later joined Sri Pratap High School, Srinagar. He did his BA IInd year from Amar Singh College, Wazir Bagh. He started playing football from a very early age and when he turned 8, he was motivated by his father, Mohd Sultan Wadoo, who had represented J&K in Santosh Trophy to pursue football rather than cricket.

Mehraj joined Iqbal Sports Club in 1996. He was member of U21 team of J&K and was noticed at the National level as a result.

Senior career
Mehrajuddin started out as a striker but then was converted into a defender, and can easily play as a defensive midfielder position. He started out with Iqbal Sports and then moved to J&K Police and then professionally at a league-level with HAL, ITI, Sporting Goa, Mohun Bagan, East Bengal.
Currently he is associated with J&K Sports Council, training young football enthusiasts of Jammu & Kashmir.

International career
He scored the winning goal against Bangladesh in the SAFF Cup finals at Karachi in December 2005. He was also a member of the Indian squad that won Nehru Cup in 2007, the AFC Challenge Cup in 2008 and the Nehru Cup again in 2009.

Awards & achievements
4 times Winner, Federation Cup & IFA Shield.
2 times Winner, Nehru Cup (2007 & 2009).
Wadoo was the best right-back in the Hero ISL during Season 2 as he helped Chennaiyin FC to the coveted Hero ISL trophy, appearing 14 times for the Super Machans.

Managerial career
In 2021–22 season, Wadoo managed Sudeva Delhi and worked as coach of the J&K Sports Council. In September 2022, he was appointed head coach of I-League side Real Kashmir after departure of David Robertson. In midway of the 2022–23 season, he was succeeded by English manager Gifton Noel-Williams in the post, in February 2023.

On 21 February 2023, Wadoo replaced Kibu Vicuña in the post of head coach of Mohammedan Sporting.

Statistics

International
Statistics accurate as of 16 December 2011.

International goals

Managerial statistics

Honours

India
 AFC Challenge Cup: 2008
 SAFF Championship: 2005; runner-up: 2008
 Nehru Cup: 2007, 2009

Chennaiyin
 Indian Super League: 2015

References

External links

 https://web.archive.org/web/20091218120305/http://goal.com/en-india/people/india/21227/mehrajuddin-wadoo
https://web.archive.org/web/20110718104018/http://www.the-aiff.com/pages/team/legenddetails_AJAX.php?legend=31&page=
https://archive.today/20130126113427/http://www.indiansportsnews.com/top-10/6131-mumbai-fc-manage-to-hold-salgaocar-prayag-win.html
https://web.archive.org/web/20120801041451/http://www.navhindtimes.in/archive/2012/04
http://www.thehardtackle.com/2012/indian-football-transfers-%E2%80%93-live-updates-june-10th/

Indian footballers
Indian Muslims
1984 births
Kashmiri people
Living people
People from Srinagar
East Bengal Club players
2011 AFC Asian Cup players
I-League players
Salgaocar FC players
Mohammedan SC (Kolkata) players
Bharat FC players
Indian Super League players
FC Pune City players
Association football midfielders
Footballers from Jammu and Kashmir
India international footballers
Indian football managers
Sudeva Delhi FC managers
Real Kashmir FC managers
Mohammedan SC (Kolkata) managers